The 1974 South Australian National Football League season was the 95th season of the top-level Australian rules football competition in South Australia.

Ladder

Finals Series

Grand Final

Events 

 On 4 May (Round 5), Football Park hosts its first SANFL game – Central Districts 21.13 (139) defeat North Adelaide 16.13 (109)

References 

SANFL
South Australian National Football League seasons